John Leonard was a Tyneside radical poet and songwriter of the early 19th century. His only dialect song was "Winlaton Hopping".

Life 
It is thought that John Leonard was born in Gateshead, County Durham, but very little is known about him, or his life.<br/ >
His father, George, was a gardener and was a described as "a man of some means" owning some property in either Jackson’s Chare or more likely Leonard’s Court (both long since demolished), near Gateshead High Street. <br/ >
John Leonard was apprenticed as a joiner, but the date of birth and date and place of death are unknown. <br/ >
As there are no records of his burial in the Gateshead (St. Mary’s ) register between 1813 and 1852, it is assumed he died elsewhere. <br/ >
A note on one of his manuscripts states that it was partly written during a three months' imprisonment. There is no further record of the offence, place or time, but as he was a radical, and was in favour of Irish Nationalism, writing a poem in praise of Charles James Fox and another denouncing William Pitt, it was possible brought about by his actions over this point.

Works 
His output was considerable and included were :-

 Winlaton Hopping – the only dialect poem he wrote, the remainder were of a political and general nature – written c 1814 – The Winlaton Hopping is thought to date back to Saxon times.
 Derwent Volunteers – A Song written to encourage the men of Derwentside to join the war against Napoleon. 
 Lamentation and confession of a crimp - Song about the activities of a press-gang agent.

Collections 
A volume of manuscripts of his poetry written c1813 and of between three or four hundred pages, is kept in the Reference Library, Newcastle. <br/ > 
A small collection of his poems of 36 pages was published in 1808 by Marshall’s, of Gateshead.

See also 
Geordie dialect words

References

External links
 FARNE - Folk Archive Resource.North East – Winlaton Hopping
Allan’s Illustrated Edition of Tyneside songs and readings 1891

English male poets
English songwriters
People from Gateshead
Writers from Tyne and Wear
Musicians from Tyne and Wear
Geordie songwriters